The Träningsserien was the top level ice hockey league in Sweden in the 1922 season. The league was won by AIK Ishockey. It was replaced by the Klass I for 1923.

1922 season

Final table

External links
1922 season

Defunct ice hockey leagues in Sweden
1
Swedish